| year3start = 2023 
| year3end = 
| appearances3 = 2 
| tries3 = 1 
| goals3 = 0 
| fieldgoals3 = 0 
| new = yes 
| source = 
| updated      = 7 March 2023
}}

In 2022 he made his Hull KR Super League début against the Huddersfield Giants.

References

External links
Hull KR profile

1994 births
Living people
Dewsbury Rams players
English rugby league players
Hull Kingston Rovers players
Rugby league players from Halifax, West Yorkshire
Rugby league props